Count Antonio Graziadei (5 January 1872 – 10 February 1953) was an Italian academic and politician. One of the co-founders of the Italian Communist Party, he was Professor of Political Economy at the Universities of Cagliari and Parma and a member of the Italian Parliament from 1910 to 1926. In 1928 he went on a self-imposed exile to France to escape fascism. After the war he began his teaching activity at the University of Rome.

Biography 
He was born in to an old aristocratic and conservative family. Despite his class origins, Graziadei, still very young, embraced the cause of the working classes and joined the Italian Socialist Party as early as 1893. In his native Imola, he met Andrea Costa, the first socialist parliamentarian in the history of Italy.

When Costa died, Graziadei replaced him in the Chamber of Deputies in 1910. At that time, he was with the right-wing of the PSI in the company of Leonida Bissolati, but unlike the PSI he will be able to avoid expelled from the party in 1912.

When the First World War broke out, he positioned himself as a maximalist socialist, and in 1921, he was among the founders of the Communist Party of Italy (PCd'I). Within this party, of which he will be a member of the Central Committee. He distanced himself both from the group around the review L'Ordine Nuovo by Antonio Gramsci, and from that of Amadeo Bordiga, and instead sided with the right wing led by Angelo Tasca.

With the advent of the fascist dictatorship, he lost his seat as a deputy, suffered attacks, experienced isolation, and finally saw himself excluded from the university environment.

Expelled from the PCd'I in 1928 because of his Marxist revisionism, he nevertheless continued throughout the 1930s to publish his books and articles on economics.  

After the collapse of the Fascist dictatorship, he was made a member of the Consulta Nazionale and obtained his readmission to the PCI.

As a teacher and economist, he was one of the most brilliant minds of his generation. Although a convinced Marxist in politics, on the other hand unorthodox in the field of Marxian economics, most notably regarding the concept of the labor theory of value.

Main writings
 Il Capitale tecnico e la teoria classico socialista del valore, Università di Bologna, Facoltà di Giurisprudenza, tesi di laurea, 1895.
 La produzione capitalistica, Torino, Bocca, 1899.
 Quantità e prezzi di equilibrio fra domanda ed offerta, Imola, 1918.
 Prezzo e sovrapprezzo nell'economia capitalistica: critica alla teoria del valore di Carlo Marx, Milano, Società editrice Avanti, 1923.
 La teoria del valore ed il problema del capitale "costante" (tecnico), Roma, Maglione e Strini, 1926.
 Capitale e salari, Milano, Monanni, 1928.
 La rente et la propriété de la terre (Critiques aux théories de Marx), Paris, Marcel Rivière, 1931.
 Le capital et la valeur: critique des théories de Marx, Paris, Pichon et Durand-Auzias, Lausanne, Rouge, 1936.
 Il risparmio, lo sconto bancario e il debito pubblico, Milano, Bocca, 1941.
 Le teorie sull'utilità marginale e la lotta contro il marxismo, Milano, Bocca, 1943.
 Le teorie sulla produttività marginale e la lotta contro il marxismo, Milano, Bocca, 1946.
 Il salario e l'interesse nell'equilibrio economico, Roma, Edizioni dell'Ateneo, 1949.
 Memorie di trent'anni 1890-1920, Roma, Rinascita, 1950.

References

External links
Commemoration of Graziadei at the Italian Parliament

1872 births
1953 deaths
People from Imola
Italian Socialist Party politicians
Italian Communist Party politicians
Deputies of Legislature XXIII of the Kingdom of Italy
Deputies of Legislature XXIV of the Kingdom of Italy
Deputies of Legislature XXV of the Kingdom of Italy
Deputies of Legislature XXVI of the Kingdom of Italy
Deputies of Legislature XXVII of the Kingdom of Italy
Members of the National Council (Italy)
Politicians of Emilia-Romagna
Academic staff of the University of Cagliari
Academic staff of the University of Parma
Academic staff of the Sapienza University of Rome
Italian Aventinian secessionists
Italian Marxists
Italian anti-fascists